Yukon Men is an unscripted American cable television series aired on the Discovery Channel. It is produced by Paper Route Productions and premiered on August 24, 2012.

The series details the lives of several inhabitants of the remote Alaskan village of Tanana which is situated by the Yukon River. These men make their living by fishing, hunting and trapping game as well as raising sled dogs and logging. The show's prominent themes are community and survival.

Initial reception
Yukon Men's critical reception by media has been mostly positive. Mark A. Perigard from the Boston Herald stated "For a network that specializes in tough-guy shows (think "Survivorman" and "Deadliest Catch"), "Yukon Men" doesn't stint on testosterone." Tom Conroy from Media Life Magazine said "The show doesn't need all this dramatic foreshadowing. The scenes of hunting, setting traps, dressing a carcass and even stoking the furnaces at the water plant are enlightening and fun. Most of the men work with their sons, and the bonding isn't overhyped. The half light of winter gives an extra beauty to the spectacular landscapes."

Key personnel
Stan Zuray: Stan was raised in Boston, Massachusetts before he moved to Alaska. He is an outdoorsman with over 40 years of experience in the Alaskan wilderness. 

Joey Zuray: Joey is Stan's son in his early twenties. According to his father, he is a natural at home in the Alaskan interior. He hunts and traps to sustain himself, his family and elders of the community. 

Charlie Wright: Charlie is a water-plant operator, mechanic, trapper and hunter. 

Robert "Bob" Wright: Robert is Charlie's son in his early twenties. Throughout the show he is being taught family traditions and skills such as beaver trapping by his father. 

The Moore family: Pat Moore owns the leading local kennel where his children Thomas Moore and Courtney Agnes work. He also has to care for his wife Lorraine. 

James Roberts: James is a major provider of lumber for Tanana. He also owns a kennel. His teenage sons help with the businesses.

List of episodes
Season 1 (2012)
{| class="wikitable plainrowheaders" style="width: 80%; margin-right: 0;"
|- style="color:white"
! style="background:#333;"| №
! style="background:#333;"| Title
! style="background:#333;"| Original air date
! style="background:#333;"| U.S. viewers(million)
|-

|}

Season 2 (2013)
{| class="wikitable plainrowheaders" style="width: 80%; margin-right: 0;"
|- style="color:white"
! style="background:#333;"| №
! style="background:#333;"| Title
! style="background:#333;"| Original air date
|-

|}

Season 3 (2014)
{| class="wikitable plainrowheaders" style="width: 80%; margin-right: 0;"
|- style="color:white"
! style="background:#333;"| №
! style="background:#333;"| Title
! style="background:#333;"| Original air date
|-

|}

Season 4 (2015)
{| class="wikitable plainrowheaders" style="width: 80%; margin-right: 0;"
|- style="color:white"
! style="background:#333;"| №
! style="background:#333;"| Title
! style="background:#333;"| Original air date
|-

|}

Season 5 (2016)
{| class="wikitable plainrowheaders" style="width: 80%; margin-right: 0;"
|- style="color:white"
! style="background:#E6E8FA;"| №
! style="background:#E6E8FA;"| Title
! style="background:#E6E8FA;"| Original air date
|-

|}

References

External links
 

2012 American television series debuts
2016 American television series endings
Animal trapping
Discovery Channel original programming
Dog sledding
English-language television shows
Hunting in popular culture
People from Tanana, Alaska
Television shows set in Alaska
Yukon River